Northeast Guilford High School is a secondary school located in McLeansville, North Carolina. The school serves grades nine through twelve, with an enrollment of 1265 students for the 2007 school year. Demographically, the school serves primarily Caucasian and African American students, who make up 47% and 43% of total enrollment respectively. The remainder of the student body is composed of Hispanics (5%), multi-racial students (3%), Asians (1%), and American Indians (1%),

Northeast Guilford has a main building, a vocational building, and a well-established amount of portable classrooms. In the year 2005, due to the increase in enrollment, Northeast Guilford was targeted for expansion. The cafeteria was updated to accommodate 500 students.  It has a new gym and a separated new building.

The school offers a NJROTC program, as well as Advanced Placement classes. Northeast Guilford's varsity football team has been the most dominating sports team in school history. The football team has been to the state playoffs 17 years in a row, all under head coach Tommy Pursley, who has never had a losing season at the school.  They currently have the third longest playoff appearance streak in the state, only behind Thomasville and Clinton, respectively.  They have won over 100 games in the last ten years and have been to two state championships and an eastern state regional championship in 10 years.  Recently the school's soccer team has become a force, going to the state playoffs and exceeding in them. The schools marching band is one of the best in the region, they came in third place in Class A in the National High Stepping Band Competition. The school's colors are navy, white, and silver.  Northeast's mascot is the Mighty Rams. 
The Northeast Guilford Choral Department is also one of the best in the state, winning over 50 national and regional titles spanning over 25 years. The choirs have also been invited to perform and several international events such as the 50th anniversary of the Battle of Normandy in France and the 2009 Heritage Festival for the Presidential Inauguration of Barack Obama.

Notable alumni
 Mitch Atkins, former MLB pitcher 
 Amanda Busick, sports reporter
 Jaylin Davis, MLB outfielder for the San Francisco Giants
 David Emanuel Hickman, United States Army soldier
 Brandon Jones, actor, musician, and producer

References

External links
 Official Site

Public high schools in North Carolina
Schools in Guilford County, North Carolina